Wilson Audio Specialties Inc. (commonly referred to as Wilson Audio) is an American high-end audio loudspeaker manufacturing company, located in Provo, Utah. Wilson Audio was co-founded by the late David A. Wilson (1944–2018) with his wife Sheryl Lee Wilson in 1974. Until his death, David Wilson was Wilson Audio's Chairman of the Board and Sheryl Lee Wilson served as Vice Chair.

Daily operations at Wilson Audio are currently directed and managed by Dave Wilson's son and successor, Daryl C. Wilson, CEO and Korbin Vaughn, COO. David  Wilson continued to work closely with Wilson Audio's R&D and Engineering team in product development until his last days.

Overview 
Wilson Audio is known in the audiophile community as offering some of the most expensive speakers around. Prior to manufacturing loudspeakers, David Wilson was a staff writer at The Absolute Sound magazine. When Wilson Audio first began offering its products in the early 1980s, the highest priced small "monitor" speaker on the US market was $1,600 per pair; Wilson's small WATT speaker was introduced at $4,400 per pair.

As of 2019, the least expensive stereo speaker from Wilson Audio, the bookshelf-sized TuneTot, is offered from $9,800 US per pair (without isolation base or stands), while their most expensive stereo speakers, the WAMM Master Chronosonic Towers, sell for $850,000 MSRP per pair and up, depending on finish. According to Stereophile in 2015, the average price of Wilson's product range is $69,325 per pair, in standard colors and finishing, and not considering potential extras.

Wilson Audio is known for building highly rigid speaker cabinets. They construct their loudspeaker enclosures from non-wood materials such as phenolic resin composites and epoxy laminates. The cabinets are painted using a high-gloss automotive process in a variety of colors.

The company's record label was called Wilson Audiophile Definitive Recordings and was known for its releases (31 in total) that were issued on LP and CD between 1977 and 1995. In July 2013, Wilson Audio began reissuing high resolution downloads of select titles.

Despite its name, there are no relations between Wilson Audio and the UK-based audio company Wilson Benesch, also a manufacturer of expensive loudspeakers.

Products
Most names of Wilson Audio products are acronyms formed from the initial components of a phrase (shown in parentheses).

Current lineup

WATCH Dog (Wilson Audio Theater Comes Home)
Passive (Released: 2006)
Thor's Hammer
Series 1 (Released: 2008)
WATCH Center Channel (Wilson Audio Theater Comes Home)
Series 3 (Released: 2011)
Mezzo
Series 1 (Released: 2011)
C/S (Released: 2013)
Alida (2-channel, 5.1, 7.1, and Atmos compatible)
Titanium Dome (Released: 2014)
C/S (Released: 2014)
Yvette
Series 1 (Released: 2016)

Alexia V
Series 1 (Released: 2022)
WAMM Master Chronosonic (Wilson Audio Modular Monitor)
Series 1 (Released: 2017)
WAMM Master Subsonic (Wilson Audio Modular Monitor)
Series 1 (Released: 2017)
Sasha DAW (David Andrew Wilson)
Series 1 (Released: 2018)
TuneTot
Series 1 (Released: 2018)
Chronosonic XVX
Series 1 (Released: 2019)
4 Seasons (Released: 2022)

Wilson Audio Subsonic
Series 1 (Released: 2019)
ActivXO (Dual Subwoofer Controller)
Series 1 (Released: 2019)
SabrinaX
Series 1 (Released: 2020)
Alexx V
Series 1 (Released: 2021)
LōKē
Series 1 (Released: 2022)

Retired products

SMART Turntable
 (Released: 1974) (Retired: 1976)
WAMM (Wilson Audio Modular Monitor)
Series 1 (Released: 1981) (Retired: 1982)
Series 2 (Released: 1982) (Retired: 1983)
Series 3A (Released: 1983) (Retired: 1987)
Series 6 (Released: 1988) (Retired: 1991)
Series 7 (Released: 1992) (Retired: 1993)
Series 7A (Released: 1993) (Retired: 2003)
WATT (Wilson Audio Tiny Tot)
Series 1 (Released: 1986) (Retired: 1989)
Series 2 (Released: 1989) (Retired: 1991)
Series 3 (Released: 1991) (Retired: 1995)
Series 5 (Released: 1994) (Retired: 2001)
Series 6 (Released: 1999) (Retired: 2004)
Series 7 (Released: 2002) (Retired: 2006)
Series 8 (Released: 2006) (Retired: 2011)
WHOW (Wilson High Output Woofer)
Series 1 (Released: 1989) (Retired: 1991)
Series 2 (Released: 1991) (Retired: 1993)
Series 3 (Released: 1993) (Retired: 2002)
Puppy
Series 1 (Released: 1989) (Retired: 1991)
Series 2 (Released: 1991) (Retired: 1995)
Series 5 & 5.1 (Released: 1994) (Retired: 2001)
Series 6 (Released: 1999) (Retired: 2004)
Series 7 (Released: 2002) (Retired: 2006)
Series 8 (Released: 2006) (Retired: 2011)

X-1 Grand SLAMM (Super Linear Adjustable Modular Monitor)
Series 1 (Released: 1993) (Retired: 1997)
Series 2 (Released: 1997) (Retired: 1999)
Series 3 (Released: 2000) (Retired: 2003)
Level 5 (Released: 2006)
WITT (Wilson Integrated Transducer Technology)
Series 1 (Released: 1995) (Retired: 1997)
Series 2 (Released: 1997) (Retired: 2000)
XS Subwoofer
Series 1 (Released: 1996) (Retired: 2005)
CUB (Center Unitized Bass)
Series 1 (Released: 1997) (Retired: 2000)
Series 2 (Released: 2000) (Retired: 2005)
MAXX
Series 1 (Released: 1998) (Retired: 2004)
Series 2 (Released: 2004) (Retired: 2008)
Series 3 (Released: 2008) (Retired: 2015)
WATCH Center Channel (Wilson Audio Theater Comes Home)
Series 1 (Released: 2000) (Retired: 2010)
Series 2 (Released: 2007) (Retired: 2011)
Surround Speaker 
Series 1 (Released: 2000) (Retired: 2009)
Series 2 (Released: 2007) (Retired: 2014)
WATCH Dog (Wilson Audio Theater Comes Home)
Series 1 (Powered) (Released: 2001) (Retired: 2003)
Series 2 (Powered) (Released: 2003) (Retired: 2008)

Sophia
Series 1 (Released: 2001) (Retired: 2009)
Series 2 (Released: 2005) (Retired: 2012)
Series 3 (Released: 2010) (Retired: 2016)
Alexandria X-2
Series 1 (Released: 2003) (Retired: 2007)
Series 2 (Released: 2007) (Retired: 2014)
Duette
Series 1 (Released: 2006) (Retired: 2014)
Series 2 (Released: 2013) (Retired: 2020)
Sasha W/P 
Series 1 (Released: 2009) (Retired: 2014)
Series 2 (Released: 2014) (Retired: 2018)
Polaris
Series 1 (Released: 2010) (Retired: 2020)
C/S (Released: 2014) (Retired: 2020)
Alexandria XLF (Cross Load Firing)
Series 1 (Released: 2012) (Retired: 2020)
Alexia 
Series 1 (Released: 2012) (Retired: 2017)
Sabrina
Series 1 (Released: 2015) (Retired: 2020)
Alexx
Series 1 (Released: 2016) (Retired: 2021)
Alexia
Series 2 (Released: 2017)

References

Fortune Article On Wilson Audio
1995 Review of Wilson WATT/Puppy 5.1 From Stereophile Magazine
2001 Review of Wilson Sophia by Soundstage on-line magazine

External links
 

Audio equipment manufacturers of the United States
Loudspeaker manufacturers
Manufacturing companies based in Utah
Electronics companies established in 1974
1974 establishments in Utah
Audiophile record labels